In the mathematical field of convex geometry, the Busemann–Petty problem, introduced by , asks whether it is true that a symmetric convex body with larger central hyperplane sections has larger volume. More precisely, if K, T are symmetric convex bodies in Rn such that

for every hyperplane A passing through the origin, is it true that Voln K ≤ Voln T?

Busemann and Petty showed that the answer is positive if K is a ball. In general, the answer is positive in dimensions at most 4, and negative in dimensions at least 5.

History
 showed that the Busemann–Petty  problem has a negative solution in dimensions at least 12, and this bound was reduced to dimensions at least 5 by several other authors.  pointed out a particularly simple counterexample: all sections of the unit volume cube have measure at most , while in dimensions at least 10 all central sections of the unit volume ball have measure at least .  introduced intersection bodies, and showed that  the Busemann–Petty problem has a positive solution in a given dimension if and only if every symmetric convex body is an intersection body. An intersection body is a star body whose radial function in a given direction u is the volume of the hyperplane section u⊥ ∩ K for some fixed star body K. 
 used Lutwak's result to show that the Busemann–Petty problem has a positive solution if the dimension is 3.  claimed incorrectly that the unit cube in R4 is not an intersection body, which would have implied that the  Busemann–Petty problem has a negative solution if the dimension is at least 4. However   showed that a centrally symmetric star-shaped body is an intersection body if and only if the function 1/||x|| is a positive definite distribution, where ||x|| is the homogeneous function of degree 1 that is 1 on the boundary of the body, and  used this to show that the unit balls l, 1 < p ≤ ∞ in n-dimensional space with the lp norm are intersection bodies for n = 4 but are not intersection bodies for n ≥ 5, showing that Zhang's result was incorrect.  then showed that the  Busemann–Petty problem has a positive solution in dimension 4.
 gave a uniform solution for all dimensions.

See also
Shephard's problem

References

Convex geometry